Vallio Terme is a comune in the province of Brescia, in Lombardy. Neighbouring communes are Agnosine, Caino, Gavardo, Odolo, Paitone, Sabbio Chiese and Serle.

References

Cities and towns in Lombardy
Spa towns in Italy